Robesonia Furnace Historic District, also known as Reading Furnace and Robesonia Iron Co. Ltd., is a historic "iron plantation" and national historic district located in Robesonia, Berks County, Pennsylvania.  The district encompasses 35 contributing buildings and 2 contributing sites.  They include 1 1/2-story single worker's housing built about 1825; stone, frame, and slag block duplexes built about 1845, 1890, and 1910; and bungalows built between about 1913 and 1915. Other notable buildings are the Second Empire style George Taylor Mansion (c. 1880), creamery building, and shed with cupola; log and stone furnace boarding house (c. 1800); miller's house (c. 1820); fire station (c. 1910); Georgian style ironmaster's mansion, or Ege Mansion (c. 1807); and Italianate style furnace office. The sites are the industrial remains of Robesonia Furnace, demolished in 1927 after acquisition by Bethlehem Steel.  The furnace was established in 1794 by George Ege.

It was listed on the National Register of Historic Places in 1991.

References

External links
Friends of the Robesonia Furnace website

Industrial buildings and structures on the National Register of Historic Places in Pennsylvania
Archaeological sites on the National Register of Historic Places in Pennsylvania
Historic districts on the National Register of Historic Places in Pennsylvania
Georgian architecture in Pennsylvania
Italianate architecture in Pennsylvania
Second Empire architecture in Pennsylvania
Houses completed in 1807
Historic districts in Berks County, Pennsylvania
National Register of Historic Places in Berks County, Pennsylvania